The Munich Security Conference (MSC) is an annual conference on international security policy that has been held  in Munich, Bavaria, Germany since 1963. Formerly named the Munich Conference on Security Policy, the motto is: Peace through Dialogue. It is the world's largest gathering of its kind.

Over the past four decades the Munich Security Conference has become the most important independent forum for the exchange of views by international security policy decision-makers. Each year it brings together about 350 senior figures from more than 70 countries around the world to engage in an intensive debate on current and future security challenges. The list of attendees includes heads of states, governments and international organizations, ministers, members of parliament, high-ranking representatives of armed forces, science, civil society, as well as business and media.

The conference is held annually in February. The venue is the Hotel Bayerischer Hof in Munich, Bavaria, Germany.

History 

The conference evolved from the Internationale Wehrkundebegegnung / Münchner Wehrkundetagung, which was founded in 1963 by Ewald-Heinrich von Kleist-Schmenzin. The resistance fighter from the Stauffenberg circle advocated to prevent military conflicts such as the Second World War in the future and brought together leaders and experts in security policy for this reason. The first meeting was limited to about 60 participants; among them were Helmut Schmidt and Henry Kissinger. Von Kleist led the meetings until 1997; his successor who led them from 1999 until 2008 was politician and business manager Horst Teltschik (CDU).

Since 2009, the conference is headed by the former diplomat Wolfgang Ischinger. Ischinger established the Munich Security Conference GmbH non-profit company in 2011, which he has led until Christoph Heusgen took over the position in February 2022. Vice Chairmen are Ambassador Boris Ruge and Dr. Benedikt Franke, who is also CEO. 

In 2018 the company was subsumed into the MSC Foundation, with an endowment from contributions by the German government and other big donors. Funding has increased from less than €1 million of public funding in 2008 to about €10 million of mostly corporate funding in 2022. One of the sponsors is the U.S. consultancy McKinsey, which organizes the conference for free on behalf of the foundation. As a result, McKinsey wields great influence on the conference's agenda, guests and events, according to Politico but denied by McKinsey.  

The Munich Security Conference was canceled twice, in 1991 due to the First Gulf War and 1997 as a result of the retirement of Kleist-Schmenzin. Under the leadership of Teltschik the Security Conference opened in 1999 for political, military and business leaders from Central and Eastern Europe as well as India, Japan and the People's Republic of China.

Purpose 
At this conference, under the theme of peace through dialogue, senior politicians, diplomats, military and security experts from the member countries of NATO and the European Union, but also from other countries such as China, India, Iran, Japan and Russia are invited to discuss the current issues in security and defense policies.

The intention of the conference is to address the topical main security issues and to debate and analyze the main security challenges in the present and the future in line with the concept of networked security. A focal point of the conference is the discussion and the exchange of views on the development of the transatlantic relations as well as European and global security in the 21st century.

The conference is organized privately and therefore not an official government event. It is used exclusively for discussion; an authorization for binding intergovernmental decisions does not exist. Furthermore, there is - contrary to usual conventions - no common final communiqué. The high-level meeting is also used to discrete background discussions between the participants. An exception is the presentation of global political decisions, such as the exchange of instruments of ratification for the New START disarmament agreement between the United States and Russia, which was held at the conclusion of the security conference in 2011.

Conferences

2003 conference 
At the 39th conference in 2003, German Minister for Foreign Affairs Joschka Fischer doubted the reasoning of the US government for a war against Iraq with the words "Excuse me, I am not convinced".

2007 conference 
See Munich speech of Vladimir Putin.

2009 conference 
From February 6–8, 2009, the 45th Munich Security Conference was attended by over 50 ministers and more than a dozen heads of state and government from all over the world, including US Vice-President Joe Biden, French President Nicolas Sarkozy, German Chancellor Angela Merkel, Polish Prime Minister Donald Tusk and Afghan President Hamid Karzai.

In 2009 the MSC inaugurated the Ewald von Kleist Award. The new award highlights the political life and work of Ewald von Kleist, who founded the Munich Security Conference. The award will be given to prominent individuals who have made an outstanding contribution to peace and conflict resolution. The winners of the Ewald von Kleist Award were in 2009 Dr Henry Kissinger and in 2010 Javier Solana de Madariaga. Also in 2009, the MSC initiated a new event format, called MSC Core Group Meeting. This new and smaller-scale event was introduced in addition to the annual main, Munich-based meeting of the Munich Security Conference. The idea is to invite a number of distinguished and high-ranking participants to changing capitals and give them the opportunity to confidentially discuss current international security policy issues and develop sustainable solutions. Meetings took place 2009 in Washington D.C., 2010 in Moscow and 2011 in Beijing.

2011 conference 
The 47th Munich Security Conference was held from 4 to 6 February 2011 and again assembled top-level decision makers from all over the world, including UN Secretary General Ban Ki Moon, German Chancellor Angela Merkel, British Prime Minister David Cameron U.S. Secretary of State Hillary Clinton and Russian Foreign Minister Sergey Lavrov whilst Belarus was excluded from the circle of attendees because of the country's human rights situation.

In 2011, two special features marked the growing role of the Munich Security Conference as a centre of attention of international security policy: European Union's High Representative of the Union for Foreign Affairs and Security Policy Catherine Ashton called for the Quartet on the Middle East, consisting of the EU, Russia, the United States and the UN, to meet within the setting of the 2011 Munich Security Conference; and during a ceremony on the sidelines of the conference, the New START Treaty (Strategic Arms Reduction Treaty) entered into force when Russia's Foreign Minister Sergey Lavrov and U.S. Secretary of State Hillary Clinton exchanged the instruments of ratification.

2012 conference 

The 48th Munich Security Conference was held from 2 to 5 February 2012.

2013 conference 

The 49th Munich Security Conference was held from 1 to 3 February 2013. The conference focused on the European debt crisis, transatlantic relations, the crisis regions of Mali and the Middle East, as well as energy security and cyber terrorism.

2014 conference 

The 50th Munich Security Conference was held from 31 January to 2 February 2014. The conference focused on the Euromaidan, New security risks, Loss of importance for Europe, NSA-Affair and New order in former Yugoslavia, as well as Middle east, and Iran's nuclear programme.

2015 conference

The 51st Munich Security Conference was held from 6 to 8 February 2015. Among the more than 400 international participants from nearly 80 countries were also 20 heads of state, 70 foreign and defense ministers and 30 CEOs of large companies. The conferences focused on the conflict in Ukraine, nuclear negotiations with Iran and the war on terror as well as the global refugees crisis.

2016 conference 

The 52nd Munich Security Conference took place from 12 to 14 February 2016. 600 international guests attended the event, including 30 heads of state, 70 foreign and defense ministers, directors of various intelligence agencies and 700 journalists from 48 countries.
The conferences focused on the conflict between NATO and the Russian Federation, Syria and the fight against IS, Middle East situation, Future of NATO, North Korean nuclear program, Intelligence Services, Ewald von Kleist Award 2016, Situation in Africa as well as Refugee crisis.

2017 conference 

The 53rd Munich Security Conference (MSC 2017) took place from 17 to 19 February 2017 at Hotel Bayerischer Hof in Munich. With a total of 680 participants, including 30 heads of state and government, nearly 60 representatives of international organizations and 65 top business leaders, it was the largest conference to date. Prominent guests and speakers were UN Secretary General António Guterres, US Vice President Mike Pence, US Secretary of Defense James Mattis, Russian Foreign Minister Sergey Lavrov, Federica Mogherini, Donald Tusk and Chinese Foreign Minister Wang Yi. 700 journalists were also accredited for the event. In addition to the main events of the security conference, there were 1,350 bilateral meetings among MSC participants and delegations. The conferences focused on the future of the EU, the Future of the West and NATO, China's foreign policy, Global Health Risks, Fight against Terrorism, Middle East and Iran as well as the US foreign policy towards Russia.

2018 conference 

The 54th Munich Security Conference (MSC 2018) took place from 16 to 18 February 2018 at the Hotel Bayerischer Hof in Munich.

2019 conference 

The 55th Munich Security Conference (MSC 2019) took place from 15 to 17 February 2019 at the Hotel Bayerischer Hof in Munich. Among the 600 participants were heads of state and government from more than 35 countries, 50 foreign and 30 defence ministers, other representatives from the fields of politics, the military, the arms industry, business and science, as well as members of international intergovernmental and civil society organizations.

2020 conference 
The 56th Munich Security Conference (MSC 2020) took place from 14 to 16 February 2020 at the Hotel Bayerischer Hof in Munich. Among the more than 500 participants were heads of state and government from 35 countries. Joe Biden, later the 46th President of the United States, committed himself to a new tone from Washington on the political world stage and regarding multilateralism. He promised: "We will be back."

2021 conference 

The 57th Munich Security Conference ("Munich Special Edition 2021") took place on 19 February in the form of a virtual online conference, without in-person attendance, due to the ongoing COVID-19 pandemic. The event was addressed by British PM Boris Johnson, German Chancellor Angela Merkel, French President Emmanuel Macron and US President Joe Biden, who declared that "America is back".

2022 conference 

The 58th MSC took place from 18 to 20 February 2022. The motto was "Turning the Tide – Unlearning Helplessness". It was attended by over 30 Heads of State, 100 ministers and the heads of many of the most important international organizations like NATO, the EU and the UN. This conference was held on a smaller scale than usual due to the COVID-19 pandemic and was largely dominated by talks about the Russo-Ukrainian Crisis escalation. UN Secretary-General Antonio Guterres notably said that the world was in a more precarious security situation than during the Cold War. US Vice President Kamala Harris also said that the US was ready to hit Moscow with tough sanctions in the event of an attack. Russia was not present at the conference, while Ukrainian President Volodymyr Zelenskyy warned Western nations that they should abandon their policy of appeasement toward Moscow, and foreshadowed the Russian onslaught which was to occur only five days later: "To really help Ukraine, it is not necessary to constantly talk only about the dates of the probable invasion... Ukraine has been granted security assurances (with the 1994 Budapest Memorandum on Security Assurances) in exchange for giving up the world's third-largest nuclear arsenal. We don't have any firearms. And there's no security."

2023 conference 

The 59th MSC took place from 17 to 19 February 2023.

Other events 
In addition to the main conference in February, the Munich Security Conference hosts a variety of other events.

Munich Young Leaders 
In 2009, the Munich Young Leaders was first launched in cooperation with the Körber Foundation. Held in parallel to the Security Conference, this annual roundtable series is designed to directly involve the next generation of decision-makers into the main conference proceedings. The Roundtable agendas as well as the participants and speakers lists are published online.

Munich Leaders Meetings 
In addition to the main conference, a series of events, the MSC Munich Leaders Meetings (previously: Core Group Meetings), were launched in November 2009 in Washington, DC. The meetings provide a select group of participants the opportunity to discuss key issues of international security policy in order to continue the work of the Security Conference and provide impulses. The location of the Core Group Meetings always varies. The subsequent events took place in Moscow in 2010, Beijing in 2011, as well as Doha in 2013. A second meeting was held for the first time in 2013 in Washington, DC. The location of the 2014 Core Group Meeting was New Delhi. The issues discussed in New Delhi were the threats of terrorism and cyber-attacks, questions of maritime security, regional and global security structures and concepts for new global governance.

The Core Group Meeting 2015 was held in Vienna. The crisis in Ukraine was a central theme of the meeting, which featured the Ukrainian Foreign Minister Pavlo Klimkin and the Russian deputy Foreign Minister Alexei Meshkov. Klimkin urged the European states to confront the Russian government head-on. The Austrian Foreign Minister Sebastian Kurz stated that any border changes in Europe were "unacceptable", but at the same time stressed the need for cooperation with Russia. While the Swiss Foreign Minister Didier Burkhalter proposed a neutral status for Ukraine, the Serbian Foreign Minister Ivica Dačić as OSCE Chairman called for a strengthening of his organization in order to prevent future conflicts.

Another Core Group Meeting took place in Tehran in October 2015. Key topics of the meeting were the implementation of the Vienna Agreement concerning the Iranian nuclear program and the political situation in the region. German Foreign Minister Steinmeier, who opened the conference together with the Iranian Foreign Minister Zarif, emphasized the importance of transparency and trust for the successful implementation of the Vienna agreement: "After the game is before the game".

In April 2016, another MSC Core Group Meeting took place in the Ethiopian capital Addis Ababa. The security situation in Africa, the fight against international terrorism, and the challenges posed by climate change and epidemics were central themes of the meeting. The Ethiopian Foreign Minister Tedros Adhanom Ghebreyesus stressed the mutual global interdependencies in all of these issues. Other participants included Ethiopian Prime Minister Hailemariam Desalegn, former Nigerian President Olusegun Obasanjo, Smaїl Chergui, African Union Commissioner, former UN Secretary-General Kofi Annan and former German President Horst Köhler.

Another Core Group Meeting was held in Beijing in November 2016. Key topics of the meeting were China's role in the international order, conflicts in the Asia-Pacific region and the geopolitical importance of the "New Silk Road". Deputy Chinese Foreign Minister, Zhang Yesui, stressed in his opening speech the importance of dialogue and cooperation for the security of the region. During the core group meeting, Chinese Vice President Li Yuanchao, reaffirmed his country's willingness to contribute to peace and security globally. Other participants included Fu Ying, chairwoman of the National People's Congress Foreign Affairs Committee, Louise Mushikiwabo, Rwandan Minister of Foreign Affairs, Markus Ederer, secretary of state at the German Foreign Office, Tom Enders, CEO of Airbus Group, and several members of the Bundestag.

Munich Strategy Retreats 
A select group of 30-50 experts, leaders and thinkers who come together in a private setting to develop recommendations on the latest security challenges.

Roundtables 
Regular roundtable events take place with varying numbers of participants, both as part of international meetings and events and as independent events. Several roundtables can be organized in the form of a "summit" and individual "conversations" can also be held in virtual form. The thematic focus ranges from European defense policy to cyber security and human security issues.

Security Innovation Board 
In 2021, the MSC Security Innovation Board was launched, bringing together a group of experts from the technology and defense policy sectors to promote exchange on innovation in the security policy field.

Cyber Security Summit 
In 2012, the first Cyber Security Summit was held in cooperation with Deutsche Telekom in Bonn. The first event was conducted under Chatham House Rule. According to media reports, the supervisory board chairman of Deutsche Bank, Paul Achleitner, the head of the construction group Bilfinger Berger, Roland Koch, as well as Peter Terium, the CEO of the energy supplier RWE and Johannes Teyssen of E.ON were in attendance.

During the summit several working groups analyzed existing cyber risks and dangers for the following industries:

 Energy
 Finances
 Health
 Logistic
 Media
 Production

On November 11, 2013 the second summit took place in Bonn. The gathering had the following four topics:

 Rebuilding trust in the digital society
 New threat scenarios for the economy
 Gaining trust, restoring trust
 Cyber defense is becoming a business-critical core skill

Unlike in 2012, the list of speakers was published:

 Neelie Kroes, Vice-President (Digital Company) of the European Commission
 Sabine Leutheusser-Schnarrenberger, German Federal Minister of Justice
 Johanna Mikl-Leitner, Interior Minister of Austria
 Ambassador Wolfgang Ischinger, Chairman of the Munich Security Conference Foundation gGmbH; Executive Vice President for Government Relations at Allianz SE
 Ehud Barak, former Prime Minister of Israel
 Jürgen Stock, Vice-President of the German Federal Criminal Police
 Scott Charney, Vice President of Microsoft
 Arthur W. Coviello, Jr., CEO of RSA Security
 Thomas Rid, lecturer at King's College London; author on issues of cyber security
 René Obermann, CEO of Deutsche Telekom; Vice President of BITKOM e.V.
 Timotheus Höttges, Chief Financial and controlling Officer of Deutsche Telekom AG; designated CEO
 Thomas Kremer, Director of Privacy, Legal Affairs and Compliance at Deutsche Telekom AG
 Klaus Schweinsberg, former editor of the business magazines Capital and Impulse; Founder and director of the Center for Strategy and senior management

The third summit was held on 3 November 2014. It was attended by 180 representatives from the fields of politics, economy, EU and NATO. In his opening speech, Telekom CEO Höttges highlighted the growing number of attacks on data and digital infrastructures, where the Telekom network recorded 1 Million attacks daily. He quoted a CSIS study that estimated the global damage caused by cybercrime to be US$575 billion per year. To protect European data against access by US authorities, Höttges called for a revision of the Safe Harbor Agreement. The intelligence coordinator of the federal government, Klaus-Dieter Fritsche, supported Höttges demands.

MSC Chairman Ischinger described the great geopolitical importance of cyber security as a result of Ukraine conflict, which had marked the return of war as political means in Europe. State Secretary Brigitte Zypries stated the planned IT Security Act in which the reporting of cyber attacks on companies from sensitive sectors was an obligation as the contribution by the German Federal Government to increase data security. Andy Mueller-Maguhn, a former spokesman for the Chaos Computer Club, stressed the importance of strong encryption for data security and warned of the "back doors", like those that RSA Security installed for the NSA. Elmar Brok, Chairman of the European Parliament Committee on Foreign Affairs, and Karl-Theodor zu Guttenberg urged to ward off cyber attacks with offensive actions and stressed the need for a deterrence component. Ben Wizner, representative of the American Civil Liberties Union and lawyer of Edward Snowden, contradicted against those needs. In separate working groups, the topics of Digital Defense, Cyber governance, Promotion of Innovation in regards to data security and preventive data protection were also discussed.

The fourth Cyber Security Summit was held on 19 and 20 September 2016 Palo Alto, Silicon Valley. The summit was jointly convened by MSC, Deutsche Telekom and Stanford University. 140 representatives from the fields of politics, security and business participated in the gathering. A central theme of the meeting was the 2016 U.S. presidential election and its possible manipulation by cyber attacks. The chairman of the Munich Security Conference, Wolfgang Ischinger, expressed his fear that such attacks could damage confidence in democratic elections in general.

Further topics were the defense against cyberterrorism, the future of warfare, the economic relevance of cybersecurity and the development of norms and rules for the Internet. MSC chairman Ischinger called for closer coordination between the worlds of politics and technology, in order to create the basis for an open, free and secure web.

In connection with the Internet of Things, Marc Goodman from the American Think Tank Singularity University warned that "everything could be hacked". Goodman predicted the Internet would feature an "epic battle" of different interest groups. Peter R. Neumann from King's College London described the hierarchical structure of law enforcement agencies as an organizational problem in combating cyber-crime, at odds with the de-centralized operating mode of the Internet.

Other participants included Dmitri Alperovitch, co-founder and CTO of CrowdStrike, Michael Chertoff, former United States Department of Homeland Security, chairman and founder of the Chertoff Group, Michael McFaul, director of the Freeman Spogli Institute at Stanford University and former US Ambassador in Russia, and Iddo Moed, Coordinator of Cybersecurity for the Israeli Foreign Ministry, Christopher Painter, Coordinator for Cyber Issues at the US State Department, Latha Reddy, former National Security Adviser of India and currently a member of the Global Commission on Internet Governance, as well as, Uri Rosenthal, former Dutch foreign minister and current Special Envoy of his country for cyber politics.

Energy Security Summit 
Together with the Frankfurter Allgemeine Zeitung, the MSC has been organizing the Energy Security Summit since 2013. The first meeting was held on 10 July 2013 in the ballroom of the Frankfurt Palmengarten under the auspices of Federal Economics and Technology Minister Philipp Rösler and Environment Minister Peter Altmaier. Other topics of the event were climate change, the geostrategic consequences of fracking and the German Energy transition.

The second Energy Security Summit was held in Berlin on 27 and 28 May 2014. Key topics of the meeting included the "shale gas revolution" in the United States and the conflict in Ukraine. In his speech, Foreign Minister Steinmeier stressed the important role of energy policy for foreign and security policy. Steinmeier pushed for a European Energy Union and urged the EU countries to demonstrate unity with regard to the Ukraine conflict. The minister stressed the need to make compromises in the Russia-Ukraine gas dispute, and warned against too high expectations of substituting American shale gas for Russian gas supplies. EU Energy Commissioner Günther Oettinger also spoke in favor of a European Energy Union with uniform gas prices. He also described Germany's energy policy as being in a "Romantic Valley”. The strategic issue of energy would require Germany to get involved with its technological and political competence, Oettinger stated. During the meeting, Ukrainian Prime Minister Yatsenyuk described the Ukraine conflict as a "global security conflict" which only Russia would be responsible for. Yatsenyuk reiterated his country's refusal to pay a "political price" in exchange for gas supplies from Russia. The premier also expressed the willingness of his country to participate in a common energy policy with the EU.

The third Energy Security Summit was held on 5 and 6 May 2015, again in Berlin. During the meeting, Iranian Oil Minister Bijan Namdar Zangeneh laid out his country's plans for the development of the energy sector after the end of sanctions. After the previously reached deal to resolve the Iranian nuclear crisis, the Minister demanded the rapid lifting of the economic sanctions. He dashed hopes that Tehran would build a gas pipeline to Europe to weaken the dominant role of Russia in the European gas market, citing transit problems and costs. At the same time, the Minister announced that his government would invest US$180 billion in the Iranian oil and gas industry by 2022. Other topics at the meeting included, among others, the proposed Energy Union in Europe, which both Maroš Šefčovič, Vice-President of the European Commission, and Rainer Baake, Parliamentary State Secretary in the Federal Ministry for Economic Affairs and Energy, called for, as well as the German energy transition. Bärbel Höhn, chairman of the German Bundestag's Environment Committee, referred to it as an important contribution by Germany to the creation of a global structure of a decentralized energy supply, which reduces dependencies and contributes to security and peace. Criticism came from Greenpeace head Kumi Naidoo, who stated that the high share of brown coal used for electricity generation was the “Achilles heel” of Germany's energy policy. Michael Fuchs, Deputy Chairman of the CDU/CSU parliamentary group, criticized the high burden placed on German citizens due to subsidies of 480 billion Euro earmarked for the energy transition.

Awards

Ewald von Kleist Award 
Since 2009, the award has been given to individuals who made a special contribution to peace and conflict resolution. The laureates receive a medal with the inscription "Peace through Dialogue", as recently John McCain (2018), Alexis Tsipras and Zoran Zaev (2019), the United Nations (2020), Angela Merkel (2021) and Jens Stoltenberg (2022).

John McCain Dissertation Award 
Beginning in 2019, and alongside the conferences, up to two political science dissertations are being honored that focus on transatlantic relations. The award is given in memory of John McCain together with the partners "Munich School of Public Policy", "Geschwister-Scholl-Institut", "University of the Federal Armed Forces", and the McCain Institute. Among other things, the award grants participation in MSC events and a prize money of up to 10,000 Euros.

See also 
 Diplomacy
 Antalya Diplomacy Forum
 International relations
 International security
 Internationalism
 Pirate Security Conference
 Raisina Dialogue
 Shangri-La Dialogue

References

External links

Diplomatic conferences in Germany
20th-century diplomatic conferences
21st-century diplomatic conferences (Security)
1963 establishments in West Germany
Recurring events established in 1963
History of Munich
Annual events in Germany
Foreign relations of Germany